Norman Carl Michael Lehr (May 28, 1901 – July 17, 1968), nicknamed "King", was a Major League Baseball pitcher who played for one season. He pitched in four games for the Cleveland Indians during the 1926 Cleveland Indians season.

External links

1901 births
1968 deaths
Major League Baseball pitchers
Cleveland Indians players
Baseball players from New York (state)
Sportspeople from Rochester, New York
Rochester Yellowjackets baseball players